His Woman, Her Man: The Ike Turner Diaries — Unreleased Funk/Rock 1970–1973 is a collection of previously unreleased Ike & Tina Turner tracks as well as some alternative versions of original songs.

The album features a few duets between Ike and Tina such as the track "It's Groovier Across The Line," a reworked version of "Country Girl - City Man" by Billy Vera & Judy Clay. Ike and Tina performed the song as "City Girl, Country Man" on In Concert in 1974.

Critical reception 
Reviewing His Woman, Her Man for AllMusic, Thom Jurek wrote:Here are some of the first ARP synthesizer and drum machine tracks ever recorded and the way Turner utilizes them, we can hear the later sounds of the P-Funk organization as well as later Earth, Wind & Fire, Lonnie Liston Smith, and Herbie Hancock's funk-jazz directions...The sound of the ARP and drum machine — in 1971! — on traditional blues tracks like "I've Got My Mojo Workin'," and Berry Gordy's "Money," turns the originals inside out and rocks them up...Wilder still are Ike's own "He Makes Me Want to Holler," with an unmistakable gospel chorus, steep funky backbeat, and the ARP put through a wah wah pedal!...Tina's voice is in its prime here, as evidenced by the opener "Can't Find My Mind," and "Baby Get It On," which were originally written for the Rolling Stones — who never recorded them.

Reissues 
His Woman, Her Man was reissued by Tuff City Records in 2016.

Track listing 
All tracks written by Ike turner, except where noted.

References 

Ike & Tina Turner compilation albums
Ike Turner albums
2004 compilation albums
Albums produced by Ike Turner